Gustavo Kuerten was the defending champion of the singles event at the Heineken Open tennis tournament, held in Auckland, New Zealand, but lost in the semifinals to Dominik Hrbatý.

Hrbatý won in the final 4–6, 6–2, 7–5 against Rafael Nadal, on his first ATP tour level final.

Seeds
A champion seed is indicated in bold text while text in italics indicates the round in which that seed was eliminated.

  Guillermo Coria (second round; withdrew)
  Jiří Novák (semifinals)
  Gustavo Kuerten (semifinals)
  Sjeng Schalken (first round)
  Vince Spadea (quarterfinals)
  Gastón Gaudio (second round)
  Fernando González (first round)
  Jarkko Nieminen (first round)

Draw

References

External links
 Singles draw
 Qualifying Singles draw

2004 Heineken Open
Singles